The 2015 Breckland District Council election took place on 7 May 2015 to elect members of Breckland District Council in England. This was on the same day as other local elections.

There had been major boundary changes since the previous district council election in 2011. The changes reduced the number of wards from 32 to 27, and the number of councillors from 54 to 49. The new boundaries did not change the Conservative party's dominance of Breckland's local politics, as they held onto around 85% of the council seats, essentially the same share of the seats as they had held in 2011. This election saw the presence of a formal UKIP group on the district council, as the party elected four councillors to become the largest opposition party.

Results

Total votes cast: 55011.

Note that the net gains and losses do not add up as the Conservatives lost several additional seats due to boundary changes.

Breckland Politics 2011-2015

After the 2011 election, 47 councillors were Conservatives, 4 were Labour and 3 were independent. This had changed by 2015 in the following ways:

In the run-up to the 2015 election, the parties nominated a variable number of candidates. Only the Conservatives came close to standing a full slate of candidates across the district. Despite the reduced number of candidates needed, most parties fell back in their number of fielded candidates: only UKIP fielded more candidates (18, up from 7) than in 2011. Labour fielded ten fewer, the Greens five, the Liberal Democrats four, and six fewer independents stood in the election.

Full results by ward

Note that the holds and gains mentioned here are strictly nominal and should only be treated as a rough guideline, as the ward map changed significantly between 2011 and 2015.

The seats of Bedingfield, Harling and Heathland, Launditch, and Swaffham were uncontested. All elected a single unopposed Conservative with the exception of Swaffham, which elected three unopposed Conservatives.

References

2015 English local elections
May 2015 events in the United Kingdom
2015
2010s in Norfolk